

General classification

References

Giro di Lombardia
1941 in Italian sport
1941 in road cycling